Virming (Lorraine Franconian Wirminge) is a commune in the Moselle department in Grand Est in north-eastern France.

History
Dependence of the ancient manor of Lorraine.
Completely destroyed during the Thirty Years' War and resettled in 1656.
The village was destroyed for 80% in 1944 and rebuilt in 1950.

See also
 Communes of the Moselle department

References

External links
 

Communes of Moselle (department)